Nazrul Islam Shamim (popularly known as Kabila) is a Bangladeshi film actor. He won Bangladesh National Film Award for Best Performance in a Negative Role for the film Ondhokar (2003).

Selected films

Awards and nominations
National Film Awards

References

External links

Bangladeshi film actors
Best Performance in a Negative Role National Film Award (Bangladesh) winners
Living people
1955 births